Zvonko is a masculine given name. Notable people with the name include:

Zvonko Bego (born 1940), former Croatian footballer
Zvonko Bogdan (born 1942), Serbian performer of traditional folk songs of Serbia, Croatia, Hungary and Romania
Zvonko Bušić (born 1946), Croatian emigrant, most known for the hijacking of TWA Flight 355 in 1976
Zvonko Ivezić (born 1949), Serbian footballer
Zvonko Jakovljević (born 1996), Serbian footballer
Zvonko Jazbec (1911–1970), Croatian football goalkeeper
Zvonko Marković (born 1975), fashion designer
Zvonko Milojević (born 1971), retired Serbian football goalkeeper
Zvonko Monsider, Croatian football goalkeeper
Zvonko Pamić (born 1991), Croatian professional footballer
Zvonko Pantović, Serbian singer and songwriter
Zvonko Strnad (1926–1979), Croatian football player
Zvonko Šundovski, former team handball player from Republic of North Macedonia
Zvonko Varga (born 1959), former Serbian/Yugoslav football manager and former player
Zvonko Vranesic (born 1938), Croatian–Canadian International Master of chess
Zvonko Živković (born 1959), Serbian footballer
Zvonko Marković, Serbian fashion designer

Croatian masculine given names
Serbian masculine given names